German submarine U-162 was a Type IXC U-boat of Nazi Germany's Kriegsmarine during World War II.

She was ordered on 25 September 1939 and was laid down on 19 April 1940 at Deutsche Schiff- und Maschinenbau AG, at Seebeck Yard in Bremerhaven, Germany, as yard number 701. She was launched on 1 March 1941 and commissioned under the command of Korvettenkapitän Jürgen Wattenberg on 9 September of that year.

During three war patrols, U-162 sank 14 vessels. However, on 3 September 1942, three British destroyers hunted U-162 down and sank her. Of a crew of fifty-one, only two died. The remainder were taken prisoner and sent to camps in the United States, where they were to remain for the rest of the war.

Design
German Type IXC submarines were slightly larger than the original Type IXBs. U-162 had a displacement of  when at the surface and  while submerged. She had two shafts and two  propellers.

U-162 was fitted with six  torpedo tubes (four fitted at the bow and two at the stern), 22 torpedoes, one  SK C/32 naval gun, 180 rounds, and a  SK C/30 as well as a  C/30 anti-aircraft gun. The boat had a complement of forty-eight.

Service history

First patrol
Following training exercises with the 4th U-boat Flotilla from 9 September 1941 to 31 January 1942, U-162 began her first war patrol as the lead boat of the 2nd U-boat Flotilla on 1 February 1942. She left her home port of Kiel on 7 February and ventured into the North Sea without stopping in occupied Norway. During 40 days at sea, U-162 sailed north of the British Isles and entered the North Atlantic, where she sank her first vessel, White Crest, on 24 February 1942.

Second patrol
U-162 returned to sea on 7 April 1942. For this patrol, she cruised south into the Caribbean Sea and the northern coast of South America. During her 63 days at sea, U-162 sank nine ships: Athelempress, Parnahyba, Eastern Sword, Florence M. Douglas, Frank Seamans, Mont Louis, Esso Houston, British Colony and Beth. Following these victories, U-162 returned to her new home port of Lorient on 8 June 1942.

Third patrol and sinking
U-162's third and final sortie began on 7 July 1942, when she left Lorient for the last time. Much like her second foray, U-162 spent her third patrol in the Caribbean Sea and off the coast of South America. Nonetheless, just four days after sinking Star of Oregon, she was detected northeast of Trinidad. Two crewmen were killed, 49 others survived.

Following the sinking of U-162, the surviving crew members were picked up by the three destroyers and sent to the United States where they gave US interrogators information about U-162's history, including where and when she was laid down, how many ships she sank and details about her home port and the design and layout of submarines that were in her class.

Summary of raiding history

See also
 Battle of the Atlantic

References

Bibliography

External links

German Type IX submarines
U-boats commissioned in 1941
U-boats sunk in 1942
World War II submarines of Germany
1941 ships
World War II shipwrecks in the Caribbean Sea
Ships built in Bremen (state)
U-boats sunk by depth charges
U-boats sunk by British warships
Maritime incidents in September 1942